Camp Anawana, later known as Kutsher's Camp Anawana, was a summer sleepaway camp overlooking Anawana Lake in Monticello, New York.

History
Camp Anawana was originally owned by Mrs. Anna Kahn. The camp's main building was destroyed by a fire on June 29, 1946. 

In 1955, the camp partnered with Clair Bee to host Kutsher's National All-Sports Camp, associated with the nearby Kutsher's Hotel. After the development of a sports-focused sleepaway camp, Kutsher's Sports Academy, the Kutsher family purchased Camp Anawana. Kutsher's Camp Anawana operated through the summer of 1992. Following the end of the summer camp program, the camp has been used by the hotel as Club Anawana, offering water sports and beach activities.

Programs
Activities at Camp Anawana included drama, Girls' Sing, intercamp sports, and color war. Later in the camp's history, Monday nights were movie nights. The last three days of a camp session included an awards night, a camp prom, and a banquet followed by a lakeside candlelight ceremony. 

The camp's sports focus included sponsoring the Anawana Invitational Tournament for both basketball and volleyball, and a Biddy Basketball Tournament for younger boys Another favorite event was to attend the Maurice Stokes Game, an annual exhibition of professional basketball players held by Milt Kutsher.

Notable alumni 
 Matisyahu, musician
 Neal Shusterman, author

Notable staff
John Beake, NFL coach

References

External links
Kutsher's Camp Anawana Alumni

1921 establishments in New York (state)
1992 disestablishments in New York (state)
Youth organizations based in New York (state)
Catskills
Defunct summer camps
Jewish summer camps in New York (state)
Jews and Judaism in Sullivan County, New York